The following is a list of the 21 cantons of the Val-d'Oise department, in France, following the French canton reorganisation which came into effect in March 2015:

 Argenteuil-1
 Argenteuil-2
 Argenteuil-3
 Cergy-1
 Cergy-2
 Deuil-la-Barre
 Domont
 Ermont
 Fosses
 Franconville
 Garges-lès-Gonesse
 Goussainville
 Herblay-sur-Seine
 L'Isle-Adam
 Montmorency
 Pontoise
 Saint-Ouen-l'Aumône
 Sarcelles
 Taverny
 Vauréal
 Villiers-le-Bel

References